Angela Buxton and Althea Gibson were the defending champions, but Buxton did not compete. Gibson partnered with Darlene Hard, and they defeated Mary Hawton and Thelma Long in the final, 6–1, 6–2 to win the ladies' doubles tennis title at the 1957 Wimbledon Championships.

Seeds

  Althea Gibson /  Darlene Hard (champions)
  Mary Hawton /  Thelma Long (final)
  Anne Shilcock /  Pat Ward (semifinals)
  Yola Ramírez /  Rosie Reyes (semifinals)

Draw

Finals

Top half

Section 1

Section 2

Bottom half

Section 3

Section 4

References

External links

Women's Doubles
Wimbledon Championship by year – Women's doubles
Wimbledon Championships
Wimbledon Championships